Samara Halperin is a video and film artist living in the San Francisco Bay Area whose works deal with themes of the queer community, often through stop-motion animation. They use video to combat the lack of queer representation in the media. They have taught video classes at Mills College since 2002. They received a BFA from The Rhode Island School of Design and a Master of Fine arts from California College of the Arts.

Filmography
2001: Tumbleweed Town 
2002: Sorry Brenda 
2004: Arcade Trade  
2006: Hard Hat Required 
2008: The Leather Daddy and the Unicorn

Awards
Goldie Award for outstanding achievements in the arts from The San Francisco Bay Guardian Newspaper 2007

References

Year of birth missing (living people)
Living people
American video artists
Artists from San Francisco
Rhode Island School of Design alumni
California College of the Arts alumni
Mills College faculty